is a discontinued compilation of classic arcade video games, and was made for iOS and Android by Bandai Namco Entertainment.

Namco Arcade was discontinued and removed from both the App Store and Google Play marketplaces on March 15, 2016. Purchased games prior to the shut down of the store can still be played.

Overview
Namco Arcade is a compilation of Namco's classic arcade games. A choice of game is playable, free of charge, once every day. Virtual "Play Coins" could be purchased for additional plays, or games could be purchased permanently until the ability to make in-app purchases were removed on February 16, 2016. Players could access a virtual store, which contained Play Coins, "arcade machines", and cheat toggles. Purchasing a game's "arcade machine" removes the Play Coin requirement for that title for unlimited play.

Additional features included online achievements, cheats, leaderboards, customizable touch screen controls, and alternative backgrounds. The tournament randomly selects a game in which to compete and upload replays.

Game list 
The app launched with Motos, Phozon, The Tower of Druaga, and Xevious. More games were added via app updates through 2012 to 2014. Pac-Land is based on the Japanese version, though it features sprites from the North American version for the Pac-Man family (which are based on the 1984 Pac-Man cartoon).

References

2012 video games
Android (operating system) games
IOS games
Namco games
Bandai Namco video game compilations
Video games developed in Japan
Products and services discontinued in 2016
Delisted digital-only games